Glenora is a rural locality in the local government area (LGA) of Derwent Valley in the South-east LGA region of Tasmania. The 2016 census recorded a population of 78 for the state suburb of Glenora.

History 
Glenora was gazetted as a locality in 1959. 

It is believed that the name was intended to be Glen Nora, after the daughter of a pioneer of the district, but it was corrupted over time.

Geography
The Tyenna River forms part of the northern boundary until it meets the Derwent River, which then forms the remainder of the northern boundary and part of the eastern. The Derwent Valley Railway line runs through from south-east to north-west.

Road infrastructure 
Route B61 (Gordon River Road) runs through from south to north-west.

References

Towns in Tasmania
Localities of Derwent Valley Council